The Eight Views of Pyongyang are a collection of beautiful scenery of Pyongyang, Korea, that are alleged to have been handed down from the time of the Joseon dynasty, in the Korean poetry and paintings.

They were modeled after the Eight Views of Xiaoxiang of the Song Dynasty of China.

The Eight Views
1. Admiring spring from Ulmildae (Ŭlmil Sangch'un, 을밀상춘/)
2. Enjoying the moon at Pubyokru (Pubyŏk Wanwŏl, 부벽완월/)
3. Monk searching at Yongmyongsa (Yŏngmyŏng Samsŭng, 영명삼승/)
4. Seeing off travelers at Pothong River (Pot'ong Songgaek, 보통송객/)
5. Boating on the Taedong River (Kŏmun Pŏpch'u, 거문범추/)
6. Listening to rain at the lotus pond (Ryŏndang Ch'ŏngu, 련당청우/)
7. Evening kingfishers at Mt. Ryongak (Ryongsan Manch'wi, 룡산만취/)
8. Spring floods at Mat'an (Mat'an Ch'ungyŏng, 마탄춘경/)

See also
 Pyongyang
 Eight Views of Xiaoxiang
 Eight Views of Korea
 Eight Views

References

External links
 [ Eight Views of Pyongyang](in Chinese)

Tourist attractions in Pyongyang
Geography of Pyongyang
Culture in Pyongyang
Arts in Korea